Sharat Chandra Srivastava is a North Indian classical violinist and music composer. He represents the Senia gharana.

Early life and training 
Srivastava was born in New Delhi on 17 October 1971. He started learning violin at the age of 7 from his grandfather, the renowned North Indian violinist Pt Joi Srivastava.

Career 
He has been performing Hindustani classical music for over 25 years. He was part of India's premier rock band Parikrama for 12 years. He left Parikrama in 1999 and started the Delhi based fusion band called Mrigya. He is also a member of the world music quartet India Alba.

He is a recipient of the National Scholarship from the Ministry of Human Resources and Development, Government of India.

In 1998, he performed with Sting in an all acoustic set at the Channel V awards held at New Delhi. He has also performed with Ustad Amjad Ali Khan, Pt. Hari Prasad Chaurasia, Pt. Birju Maharaj and many other stalwarts.

As a teacher 
Sharat has taught Indian classical violin at the Gandharva Mahavidyalaya, New Delhi from 1999 to 2007.
He has conducted masterclasses at the University of Edinburgh, Royal Scotland Academy of Music and Drama, University of Stratclythe, Glasgow, Scotland. Additionally, he has conducted workshops in Winterthur University, Switzerland and Casa de la India, Valladolid, Spain.

Performance in music festivals 
 Yuva Mahotsava by Sahitya Kala Parishad
 Little Chilli Festival (London)
 Singapore Arts Festival
 Druga Godba Festival
 Canada National Day (Toronto)
 Edinburgh Fringe Festival
 Dubai Jazz Festival
 Khajuraho Millennium Festival (India)
 The Great Arc Festival
 New Zealand Arts Festival, 2004
 India Meets Spain, 2006
 Tansen Sangeet Samaroh, Gwalior, India (2016)

As a composer 
 Music composer for the documentary Lime Buildings Breathe by Satyen Wanchoo.
 Music composer for the dance drama Game of Dice by Sadhya
 Music composer for the dance drama Natraj – the Lord of Dance by Sadhya
 Music composer for UNDP's Stand Up, Make Noise programme on 18 September 2010 featuring a 100-piece Indian instrumental orchestra]
 Music composer for ICCR website
 Music composer for the dance drama Maharaas by Lokchhanda
 Music composer for the television serial 'Ek Tha Rusty' telecast on Doordarshan National
 Music composer and conductor for the cultural programme of the India Africa Summit 2015 held on 29 October 2015 at Rashtrapati Bhavan, New Delhi

Strings of the World 
Sharat is the festival director of Strings of the World — a world music festival dedicated to string instruments. It was held in New Delhi in the month of November from 2012 till 2015, and featured award-winning string players from Norway and Scotland. The fifth edition of Strings of the World was held at NCPA in Mumbai in October 2019

Discography 
 Reels and Ragas, India Alba
 High Beyond, India Alba
 East Blends West, Various artists, Virgin Music India, 2011
 No Passport Control, Perseverance Records, 2021

Collaborations with other musicians 
 Igor Bezget
 Trondheim Soloists
 Vinnie Colaiuta (on the track 'No Passport Control')

Style 
Sharat's training under his guru/grandfather, the renowned violinist Pandit Joi Srivastava, has made him proficient in the 'Dhrupad-Ang', a style unique to this Gharana under the Guru-Shishya Parampara.

Awards and nominations 

 Nomination for best music debut at GIMA Music Awards 2012

Interviews 
 Washington Bangla Radio, 06/12/2012

References

External links 
 official site
 Lime Buildings Breathe
 UNDP Concert at Purana Quila on 18 September 2010
 Maharaas by Lokchhanda
A Musical
1971 births
Hindustani instrumentalists
Hindustani violinists
Indian violinists
Living people 

21st-century violinists

Journey on Career Ahead Magazine